The discography of American rapper MC Ren Consists of four studio albums, three collaborative albums, two extended plays, 21 singles (including 7 as a featured artist) as well as three movie soundtracks.

Albums

Studio albums

Extended plays

Singles

As lead artist

As featured artist

Guest appearances

Music videos

As lead artist

As featured artist

Cameo appearances

References

MC Ren
Hip hop discographies

Discographies of American artists